Antonio Amaya Carazo (born 31 May 1983) is a Spanish former footballer who played as a central defender.

He spent most of his professional career with Rayo Vallecano, making 254 appearances across three spells in all of the top three divisions.

Club career

Early years and Rayo
Born in the capital of Madrid, Amaya began his career at local San Cristóbal de los Ángeles. He joined another team in the community, Rayo Vallecano, in 2002, also serving a six-month loan spell at lowly UD San Sebastián de los Reyes in the Segunda División B.

Eventually, Amaya returned to Rayo, becoming an important defensive unit for a side that returned to Segunda División at the end of the 2007–08 season and comfortably retained their league status the following campaign, with the player appearing in less than half of the games (18 out of 42).

Wigan Athletic
Amaya signed for Premier League club Wigan Athletic on a three-year contract on 14 August 2009, being joined by Rayo teammate Mohamed Diamé a week later. He made his debut in a 4–1 defeat at Blackpool in that campaign's Football League Cup on the 26th, scoring his team's goal with a header in stoppage time.

After failing to make a single league appearance in 2009–10, Amaya returned to former club Rayo in a season-long loan. He was regularly used, as they returned to La Liga after an eight-year absence.

Betis
On 18 July 2011, Wigan announced the departure of Amaya, who signed a three-year contract with Real Betis. He scored his first goal for the team on 1 December 2013, in a 2–2 home draw against former side Rayo.

Return to Rayo
In early June 2014, following Betis' top-flight relegation, Amaya once again returned to Rayo Vallecano. He finished the first season in his second spell with 19 games and one goal, helping them to easily avoid relegation.

On 20 December 2015, Amaya was on target at the Santiago Bernabéu Stadium, but his team had to play with nine players for more than 60 minutes and were eventually crushed 10–2 by hosts Real Madrid. The veteran contributed 17 matches and one goal in the 2017–18 campaign, helping to promotion to the top tier as champions.

UCAM Murcia
On 31 July 2018, Amaya signed with third division club UCAM Murcia CF.

Personal life
Amaya's older brother, Iván, was also a footballer and a central defender. Both represented local Rayo. 

Their family were Romani people.

Honours
Rayo Vallecano
Segunda División: 2017–18
Segunda División B: 2007–08

References

External links

1983 births
Living people
Spanish Romani people
Footballers from Madrid
Romani footballers
Spanish footballers
Association football defenders
La Liga players
Segunda División players
Segunda División B players
Tercera División players
Rayo Vallecano B players
Rayo Vallecano players
UD San Sebastián de los Reyes players
Real Betis players
UCAM Murcia CF players
Wigan Athletic F.C. players
Spanish expatriate footballers
Expatriate footballers in England
Spanish expatriate sportspeople in England